Carmelo Martínez Salgado (born July 28, 1960) is a former professional baseball player who has been a member of the Chicago Cubs organization since 1997. He played all or part of nine seasons in Major League Baseball, primarily as a first baseman and outfielder, from 1983 to 1991. He is the cousin of Edgar Martínez.

Career
On August 22, 1983, Martínez hit a home run in his very first major league at-bat for the Cubs. The homer came off Cincinnati's Frank Pastore in the 5th inning at Wrigley Field.

On December 7, 1983, Martínez was traded by the Cubs along with Craig Lefferts and Fritzie Connally to the San Diego Padres for pitcher Scott Sanderson. He and Kevin McReynolds were dubbed the M&M Boys on the 1984 San Diego Padres team that reached the first World Series in franchise history. Martínez had 66 RBIs, while McReynolds shared the team lead with 20 home runs.

On July 25, 2008, Martínez was involved in a minor league brawl while serving as interim manager of the Chicago Cubs' Single-A affiliate Peoria Chiefs. He approached Donnie Scott, manager of the Dayton Dragons, and engaged in a heated discussion before shoving him, resulting in emptied benches.

Martinez is currently the manager of the Arizona League Cubs.

Prior to the 2019 Caribbean Series, Martínez was named manager of the Cangrejeros de Santurce after his predecessor Ramón Vázquez quit minutes after winning the LBPRC title.

See also
 List of Major League Baseball players from Puerto Rico

References

External links
  
 Baseball Almanac

1960 births
Living people
Buffalo Bisons (minor league) players
Calgary Cannons players
Caribbean Series managers
Chicago Cubs players
Cincinnati Reds players
Iowa Cubs players
Kansas City Royals players
Major League Baseball first basemen
Major League Baseball left fielders
Major League Baseball players from Puerto Rico
Major League Baseball right fielders
Mexican League baseball players
Midland Cubs players
Minor league baseball managers
Nippon Professional Baseball first basemen
Nippon Professional Baseball outfielders
Orix BlueWave players
People from Dorado, Puerto Rico
Philadelphia Phillies players
Pittsburgh Pirates players
Puerto Rican expatriate baseball players in Canada
Puerto Rican expatriate baseball players in Japan
Puerto Rican expatriate baseball players in Mexico
Quad Cities Cubs players
San Diego Padres players
Senadores de San Juan players
Sultanes de Monterrey players
Vaqueros de Bayamón players
Uni-President 7-Eleven Lions coaches